The Deputy Chief of the Air Staff (DCAS) was a senior appointment in the Royal Air Force. The incumbent was the deputy to the Chief of the Air Staff. The post existed from 1918 to 1969. Today, the Chief of the Air Staff's deputy is titled as the Assistant Chief of the Air Staff.

History
The post was created on 3 January 1918 as part of the preliminary work before the creation of the RAF and the incumbent sat on the Air Council. However, with the establishment of the RAF on 1 April 1918, the Deputy Chief of the Air Staff was removed from the Air Council. From the mid-1920s to 1938, the Deputy Chief of the Air Staff was double-hatted as the RAF's Director of Operations and Intelligence. In 1930, when Trenchard stepped down as Chief of the Air Staff, the Deputy Chief of the Air Staff was once again appointed to the Air Council.

Deputy Chiefs of the Air Staff
Holders of the post included:
3 January 1918 Major-General M E F Kerr
1 April 1918 Brigadier-General R M Groves
12 August 1918 Brigadier-General O Swann
February 1919 Brigadier-General R M Groves (Also Director of Operations and Intelligence)
8 September 1919 Air Commodore J M Steel (Also Director of Operations and Intelligence)
12 April 1926 Air Commodore C L N Newall (Also Director of Operations and Intelligence)
6 February 1931 Air Commodore C S Burnett (Also Director of Operations and Intelligence)
1 February 1933 Air Vice-Marshal E R Ludlow-Hewitt (Also Director of Operations and Intelligence)
26 January 1935 Air Vice-Marshal C L Courtney (Also Director of Operations and Intelligence)
25 January 1937 Air Vice-Marshal R E C Peirse (Also Director of Operations and Intelligence)
22 April 1940 Air Vice-Marshal W S Douglas
25 November 1940 Air Vice-Marshal A T Harris
1 June 1941 Air Vice-Marshal N H Bottomley (from 3 May 1942 to 30 Jul 1943 the post was titled Assistant Chief of the Air Staff (Operations))
September 1945 Air Marshal Sir Albert Durston
4 February 1948 Air Marshal Sir Hugh Walmsley
1 March 1950 Air Chief Marshal Sir Arthur Sanders
17 March 1952 Air Chief Marshal Sir John Baker
1 November 1952 Air Marshal Sir Ronald Ivelaw-Chapman
9 November 1953 Air Marshal Sir Thomas Pike
4 July 1956 Air Marshal Sir Geoffrey Tuttle
15 November 1959 Air Marshal Sir Charles Elworthy
18 July 1960 Air Marshal Sir Ronald Lees
June 1963 Air Marshal Sir Christopher Hartley
1 April 1966 Air Marshal Sir Reginald Emson
30 January 1967 Air Marshal Sir Peter Wykeham

References

Royal Air Force appointments